Year 1490 (MCDXC) was a common year starting on Friday (link will display the full calendar) of the Julian calendar.

Events 
 January–December 
 January 4 – Anne of Brittany announces that all those who ally themselves with the king of France will be considered guilty of the crime of Lèse-majesté.
 March 13 – Charles II becomes Duke of Savoy at age 1; his mother Blanche of Montferrato is regent.
 March or April – 1490 Ch'ing-yang event, a presumed meteor shower or air burst over Qingyang in Ming dynasty China, said to have caused casualties.
 July 13 – John of Kastav finishes a cycle of frescoes in the Holy Trinity Church, Hrastovlje (modern-day southwestern Slovenia).
 November 20 – The first edition of the chivalric romance Tirant lo Blanch, by Joanot Martorell, is printed in Valencia.
 December 19 – Anne of Brittany is married to Maximilian I, Holy Roman Emperor by proxy.

 Date unknown 
 Ashikaga Yoshitane becomes shōgun of Japan.
 Perkin Warbeck claims to be the son of King Henry VII of England, at the court of Burgundy.
 Traditional date of the Battle of Glendale (Skye) between the Scottish clans MacDonald and MacLeod.
 Catholic missionaries arrive in the African Kingdom of Kongo.
 Pêro da Covilhã arrives in Ethiopia.
 Regular postal service connects the Habsburg residences of Mechelen and Innsbruck, the first in Germany.
 Leonardo da Vinci observes capillary action, in small-bore tubes.
 Leonardo da Vinci develops an oil lamp: the flame is enclosed in a glass tube, placed inside a water-filled glass globe.
 All Saints' Church, the Schlosskirche in Wittenberg, is begun.
 Tirant lo Blanch, by Joanot Martorell and Martí Joan de Galba, is published.
 Aldus Manutius moves to Venice.
 John Colet receives his M.A. from Magdalen College, Oxford.
 Johann Reuchlin meets Giovanni Pico della Mirandola.
 Merchants carry coffee from Yemen to Mecca (approximate date).
 Battle of Chocontá: The northern (zaque) tribes of the pre-Columbian Muisca Confederation (central Colombia) are beaten by the southern (zipa) tribes.

Births 
 February 14 – Valentin Friedland, German scholar and educator of the Reformation (d. 1556)
 February 17 – Charles III, Duke of Bourbon, French military leader (d. 1527)
 March 6 – Fridolin Sicher, Swiss composer (d. 1546)
 March 22 – Francesco Maria I della Rovere, Duke of Urbino, Italian noble (d. 1538)
 March 24 – Giovanni Salviati, Italian Catholic cardinal (d. 1553)
 April – Vittoria Colonna, Italian poet (d. 1547)
 April 4 – Vojtěch I of Pernstein, Bohemian nobleman (d. 1534)
 May 17 – Albert, Duke of Prussia, last Grand Master of the Teutonic Knights (d. 1568)
 June 28 – Albert of Mainz, German elector and archbishop (d. 1545)
 July 25 – Amalie of the Palatinate, Duchess consort of Pomerania (d. 1524)
 August 5 – Andrey of Staritsa, son of Ivan III "the Great" of Russia (d. 1537)
 September 23 – Johann Heß, German theologian (d. 1547)
 October – Olaus Magnus, Swedish ecclesiastic and writer (d. 1557)
 October 12 – Bernardo Pisano, Italian composer (d. 1548)
 November 10 – John III, Duke of Cleves (d. 1539)
 December 25 – Francesco Marinoni, Italian Roman Catholic priest (d. 1562)
 December 26 – Friedrich Myconius, German Lutheran theologian (d. 1546)
 December 30 – Ebussuud Efendi, Ottoman Grand Mufti (d. 1574)
 approx. date – Properzia de' Rossi, Italian Renaissance sculptor (d. 1530)
 date unknown
Archibald Douglas, 6th Earl of Angus, Scottish noble (d. 1556)
Luca Ghini, Italian physician and botanist (d. 1566)
Bars Bolud Jinong, Mongol Khagan (d. 1531)
Argula von Grumbach, German Protestant reformer (d. 1564)
Jean Salmon Macrin, French poet (d. 1557)
Caspar Schwenckfeld, German theologian (d. 1561)
Anna Bielke, Swedish noble and commander (d. 1525)
David Reubeni, Jewish political activist and mystic (d. 1541)
 probable
 Wijerd Jelckama, Frisian rebel and warlord (d. 1523)
 Adriaen Isenbrandt, Flemish painter (d. 1551)
 Richard Rich, 1st Baron Rich, Lord Chancellor of England (d. 1567)
 María de Toledo, Vicereine and regent of the Spanish Colony of Santo Domingo (d. 1549)
 John Taverner, English composer and organist (d. 1545)
 María de Salinas, Lady Willoughby, Spanish lady-in-waiting and friend to Catherine of Aragon
 Quilago, queen regnant of the Cochasquí in Ecuador (d. 1515)

Deaths 

 January 27 – Ashikaga Yoshimasa, Japanese shōgun (b. 1435)
 March 6 – Ivan the Young, Ruler of Tver (b. 1458)
 March 13 – Charles I, Duke of Savoy (b. 1468)
 April 6 – King Matthias Corvinus of Hungary (b. 1443)
 May 12 – Joanna, Portuguese Roman Catholic blessed and regent (b. 1452)
 May 22 – Edmund Grey, 1st Earl of Kent (b. 1416)
 August 11 – Frans van Brederode, Dutch rebel leader (b. 1465)
 date unknown
 Martí Joan de Galba, Catalan novelist
 Aonghas Óg, last independent Lord of the Isles

References